Chubdar may refer to:
Chubdar-e Olya, a village in Iran
Chubdar-e Pain, a village in Iran